Jagathy N. K. Achary (1924–1997) was an Indian dramatist and writer who also worked in Malayalam films. He was known for his plays and screenplays. He is the father of actor Jagathy Sreekumar.

Life sketch
Jagathy N. Kochukrishnan Achary was born in 1924 at Krishnavilasam in Jagathy, Trivandrum, then capital of Travancore, to "Ananthapadmanabhan" Nanu  Achary and Ponnammal. He had his education in Thiruvananthapuram and Scott Christian College, Nagercoil. After obtaining a BA in literature, he followed up with a degree in Law.

Kochukrishnan's  paternal ancestors were involved in the construction works of many palaces and stately mansions in Travancore built during the latter half of the nineteenth century. His grandfather Krishnan Achari and his brother were given land to settle down in Jagathy. N. K. Kochukrishnan’s father was Kottaram Moothchari under Moolam Thirunal and Chithira Thirunal Balarama Varma of erstwhile Travancore.

He was married to Prasanna (Ponnamma) from Edavanacaud had three children: Jagathy Sreekumar, P. K. Krishnakumar and P. K. Jameela.

He died of old age diseases in 1997 at his Thiruvananthapuram residence. A road in Cotton Hill, Vazhuthacaud, Thiruvananthapuram is named after him.

Education and career
He started his career as an employee at the palace. Later, he joined the All India Radio as a staff artist where he worked as a programme executive at various stations and subsequently rose to the position of Station Director.

Kochukrishnan wrote many plays for the radio, crossing over to writing more than twenty plays for professional theatre, and subsequently films. Many of his screenplays were published and enacted by amateur theatre groups all over Kerala. His first work was in Vimal Kumar’s Achanum Makanum in the year 1957, followed by Ummini Thanka in 1961 and Velu Thambi Dalawa in 1962.

He was a partner of the Kalanilayam Theatre group, for which he wrote many plays. During the 1960s-70s, Kalanilayam revolutionised Malayalam theatre, with its dramas like Raktharakshass, Kayamkulam Kochunni, Kadamattathu Kathanar, Iravikkodu Pillai, Naradan Keralathil, Taj Mahal, Sree Guruvayoorappan and Alavudinum Athbhuthavilakkum, all simultaneously with his illustrious career in films. He was closely associated with directors such as K. G. George and Padmarajan; starting a drama school with the former in the 1980s and appearing in cameo roles in the later's films such as Moonnam Pakkam and Desatanakkili Karayarilla.
Other published plays include Podikkai,Karakku Company,Noorjahan,Lahari, Podikkai,Japan Daivam etc.

He is a recipient of the Kerala Sangeetha Nataka Akademi Award (1983) and the Kerala Sangeetha Nataka Akademi Fellowship (1991).

Film career
Kochukrishnan penned story, screenplay and dialogues for more than 33 Malayalam movies and  also experimental films such as Sexilla Stundilla, Paathirapattu etc. He also wrote films with strong female characters in the 60s and 70s.

Filmography as screenwriter

References

External links
 Genealogy - Geni - private profile - Genealogy
 Profile of Malayalam Story Writer Jagathy NK Achari

20th-century Indian dramatists and playwrights
Indian male dramatists and playwrights
20th-century Indian male actors
Indian male stage actors
Male actors from Thiruvananthapuram
Malayalam-language writers
Malayalam-language dramatists and playwrights
Male actors in Malayalam cinema
Indian male film actors
Malayalam screenwriters
1997 deaths
1924 births
Screenwriters from Thiruvananthapuram
20th-century Indian male writers
20th-century Indian screenwriters
Recipients of the Kerala Sangeetha Nataka Akademi Fellowship
Recipients of the Kerala Sangeetha Nataka Akademi Award